Much-Binding-in-the-Marsh was a comedy show broadcast from 1944 to 1950 and 1951 to 1954 by BBC radio and in 1950–51 by Radio Luxembourg. It was written by and starred Richard Murdoch and Kenneth Horne as officers in a fictional RAF station coping with red tape and the inconveniences and incongruities of life in the Second World War. After the war the station became a country club and finally the show became the chronicle of a newspaper, The Weekly Bind. 

Among the supporting cast were Sam Costa as the officers' batman, Maurice Denham in a multitude of roles, Diana Morrison, Dora Bryan and Nicholas Parsons. Singers in the musical interludes in the show included Gwen Catley, Maudie Edwards. Binnie Hale and Doris Hare. Among those appearing as guest stars were Phyllis Calvert, Richard Dimbleby, Glynis Johns, Alan Ladd and Jean Simmons. 

The show followed ITMA as the most popular British radio comedy, and was succeeded by Take It From Here and The Goon Show. After the show ended, its two stars returned to radio in later long-running series.

Background
During the Second World War radio comedy was an important feature of British national life. The fledgling television service started by the BBC in 1936 was suspended for the duration of the war and radio was the sole broadcasting medium. The most prominent comedy show, It's That Man Again (ITMA), ran from 1939, and was reaching audiences of 16 million listeners by 1941. As well as broadcasting to the civilian population the BBC had to provide entertainment for the armed forces. From early 1940 the BBC's General Forces Programme broadcast a show called Merry-go-Round, originally a musical show to which comedy interludes were introduced. From this the BBC developed comedy shows aimed at each of the three branches of the armed forces: Eric Barker's HMS Waterlogged for the Royal Navy, Charlie Chester's Stand Easy for the Army and Much-Binding-in-the-Marsh for the Royal Air Force (RAF), all largely written and performed by serving members of the respective services. The shows were broadcast in turn on a three-weekly cycle under the overall Merry-go-Round banner.

Much-Binding was written by and starred Kenneth Horne and Richard Murdoch, both RAF officers working together at the Air Ministry in London. Horne had been a contributor to an earlier BBC radio show for the Air Force, Ack-Ack, Beer-Beer; Murdoch was well known to listeners from his pre-war role as co-star with the comedian Arthur Askey in the show Band Waggon. As the established star, Murdoch was given top billing in the new show.

1944–1946: RAF station
"Much-Binding-in-the-Marsh", a fictional RAF base in remote rural England, was the invention of Horne. It drew on the name of a real RAF station at Moreton-in-Marsh, Gloucestershire, along with the word "binding", Air Force slang for grumbling or complaining. The first broadcast was a one-off given by Horne and Murdoch on a BBC show for the armed forces, ENSA Half Hour, on 4 January 1944. Murdoch believed the idea could be developed into a series and the two men worked together on it. The producer of Merry-go-Round, Leslie Bridgemont, liked what they sent him and booked them to appear in the programme on 31 March 1944. Horne's biographer Norman Hackforth writes that the show "wasn't exactly an overnight sensation" but Bridgemont liked it enough to commission further episodes, and the show's popularity grew. 

In the first shows the only regular characters were Horne's ponderous but genial Air Officer Commanding and Murdoch's junior officer, intelligent, humorous and able to manipulate his dim-witted superior. They were joined for a few early programmes by Joyce Grenfell, and in October 1944 Sam Costa joined the cast, and became a permanent fixture as the OR aircraftsman. 

The original idea for the show's signature tune, which became one of the best-known on BBC radio, was Horne's. He suggested to Murdoch that it would be a good idea if they had a song that began:

They worked out the shape of the rest of the tune and got their accompanist, Sidney Torch, to polish it and write it down in musical score. It consisted of an eight-line verse, of which a typical example is:
    At Much-Binding-in-the-Marsh
    Security has never been neglected.
    At Much-Binding-in-the-Marsh,
    We're careful that our station's not detected.
    To camouflage the aeroplane, instead of using net,
    The other day we painted it, and much to our regret,
    We did it so successfully we haven't found it yet,
    At Much-Binding-in-the-Marsh.

Each week the closing music for the show consisted of four verses of the song, rising a semitone from one verse to the next. Over the years Horne and Murdoch wrote more than 500 verses for it, including topical material in the lyrics. In the early years they wrote in their office at the Air Ministry. Later they would meet either at Murdoch's house near Tunbridge Wells, Horne's flat in Kensington or the Royal Automobile Club in Pall Mall. They would toss ideas about and make notes of them; one of them would then turn the notes into a script to be transcribed by Bridgemont's secretary. Typically, on the day of broadcast, the show would be rehearsed from 1 p.m. to 2.30, with a full run-through at 5 p.m. The show would be given before a studio audience, broadcast live in the evening, and recorded for repeat transmission on home and forces networks later.

In the early shows, under the Merry-go-Round banner, the first half, with comic dialogue and narrative, was set in Murdoch's office at Much-Binding, after which the scene moved to the canteen for a concert—a spoof of typical NAAFI entertainments. "Flight Officer Flannel"—played by Binnie Hale, Dorothy Carless or Doris Hare—according to availability, would sing, as would Costa. Murdoch would perform one of his nonsense lyrics to well-known classical tunes, Horne would play the saxophone, and the show would conclude with a lively piece from the orchestra. Later, the show followed the precedent of ITMA and other programmes by being divided into comedy sections interspersed with music. Much-Binding settled into a pattern of three comedy sections separated by two musical slots: the first for the orchestra alone and the second for orchestra with singer.

1947−1950: Country Club
By the end of the war, Much-Binding, sharing the Merry-go-Round slot with other shows, had appeared for only 20 episodes, but was on its way to overtaking ITMA as the most popular British radio comedy. The BBC was anxious to continue the show with a new, civilian setting. A factory—"Much-Binding Enterprises Ltd"—and a crammer for backward schoolboys were considered, but it was finally agreed that the two former Much-Binding officers, discovering their old station up for sale, should buy it and turn it into the Much-Binding Country Club.

After the signature tune (the "Much-Binding" tune, for orchestra only) and opening announcement, usually by Philip Slessor, "Much-Binding takes the air!", Horne would introduce "Your old friend, Richard Murdoch!", to deliver a monologue outlining the news—ranging from incongruous to bizarre—from Much-Binding over the past week. This would be followed by the first musical interlude, after which Horne would enter, greeted by Murdoch with, "Good morning, sir. It is good to see you", and then, as Barry Johnston, Horne's biographer, puts it, "they would be off, gradually bringing in the other characters one by one".

Between January and June 1948 Murdoch wrote six instalments of The Chronicles of Much-Binding-in-the-Marsh, a spin-off series, published monthly, in The Strand Magazine.

For the recording on 28 December 1948, the queen and a party of 12 were in the audience; included in the party were Princess Elizabeth (later Queen Elizabeth II) who was on her first public appearance since the birth of her first son—Charles, Prince of Wales, six months earlier—and her husband, Prince Philip, Duke of Edinburgh. Several references to the royals were made during the programme and during the closing song Murdoch used his catchphrase "Good old Char-lee!"

The number of listeners dropped sharply after the ninth episode of the series, falling from 74 per cent of the audience in March 1949 to 39 percent in late June. The drop caused consternation at the BBC. T. W. Chalmers, the Controller of the BBC Light Entertainment Programme, considered the public had tired of the programme because Horne and Murdoch were too tied to the characters and were unable to devise any new storylines that fitted with the format. The BBC decided to cut short the series and did not pick up the option of a further thirteen programmes. The place once held by ITMA and then Much Binding as Britain's most popular radio comedy was now occupied by Take It From Here.

1950−1951: Commercial radio

Although the BBC promised a new series for the following year to Murdoch, Horne and Costa to ensure they did not look for work elsewhere, they accepted an offer from Radio Luxembourg for £50,000 for one series. The BBC were angered by the move of the series to Radio Luxembourg, but as none of the performers were under contract to the organisation at that point, they were not constrained by the restrictive clause in all BBC contracts that stopped performers working for the organisation and for its competitors. As they could not stop them from working for Radio Luxembourg, the BBC withdrew its offer of a series the following year and did not renew its contract with Horne to return as the chairman of Twenty Questions.

Much-Binding ran for one series of thirty-four shows on Radio Luxembourg between October 1950 and June 1951, broadcast at 3 pm on Sundays. The cast comprised Murdoch, Horne, Costa, Denham and Bryan. The programmes were compered by Bob Danvers-Walker, who announced the sponsor, Mars bars. Confectionery was still under rationing in the early 1950s, but the cast were given free supplies of chocolate by the sponsors, to the delight of their young families. Murdoch was not happy with the series and said "It wasn't really a great success—even my mother said it was rotten, and she was my greatest fan".

With the departure of Horne and Murdoch, the BBC were concerned that other popular variety performers could abandon the station to join Radio Luxembourg. The corporation began searching for new performers and new styles to showcase, which led them to sign the Goons, whose show was first broadcast in May 1951.

1951−1954: BBC and The Weekly Bind
Returning to the BBC in September 1951, the show was titled Over to You for its first season. Murdoch and Horne had additional input to the scripts from Anthony Armstrong and Talbot Rothwell. The final series of the show was titled Much Binding and was broadcast from July 1953 to March 1954, every Friday at 9:30 pm. The return of the programme saw Murdoch and Horne pictured on the cover of The Radio Times and an interview with the cast inside. The show's premise changed to Murdoch inheriting the newspaper Sticklecrumpets Weekly, which was soon changed to The Weekly Bind. According to Horne, the paper's "circulation was only two when we took over—both elderly gentlemen who had somehow forgotten to cancel their subscriptions".

Morrison had left at the end of the previous series and was replaced by Dora Bryan, who joined the cast as Miss Gladys Plum, the newspaper's fashion expert. Costa played Prudence Gush, the radio critic and Denham added more roles to his repertoire, including Mr Bubul the printer, Mulch the gardener, and "the strip man—the chap who draws those thrilling adventures on the back page". He was not available after episode 23, and his place was taken by Nicholas Parsons.

In one episode the paper ran out of the letter 'e' and Mr Bubul replaced all of them with the letter 'o', turning the paper into The Wookly Bind. The sports section included a report on the "crickot" that began "Aftor tho Tost match at Loods, tho Onglish toam was agrood by tho soloctors at a committoo mooting", and Betty Grable became "Botty Grablo". In another episode Denham played all the parts of a whodunit (the butler, maid, Sir Anthony Dunkels, Lady Dunkels, their daughter and her boyfriend); he also provided the sound effects of a cocktail shaker, horse's hooves and a closing door, all completed within three minutes. Johnson described Denham's performance as "an incredible tour de force, switching from one voice to the other, until the play ended with all the characters being shot by a revolver".

Later
Much-Binding-in-the-Marsh was a hit with Australian listeners, and in 1954 Murdoch was contracted by the Australian Broadcasting Commission for four months to provide a weekly variety programme Much Murdoch. He tried to persuade Horne to accompany him, but Horne's work as sales director of Triplex Safety Glass was too busy to take a long break. Horne managed to travel to Australia to record eight shows of the series, which were retitled Much Murdoch and Horne for his appearances.

By the mid-1950s, tastes in comedy had changed and many of the wartime favourites—including ITMA, Stand Easy and Waterlogged Spa—were no longer on air, replaced by programmes featuring a new generation of performers and writers. According to Johnston, "the gentle humour of Much-Binding now seemed rather old-fashioned" and the programme was not renewed. Both the stars of Much Binding went on to later long-running BBC radio series: Horne to Beyond Our Ken (1958–1964) and Round the Horne (1965–1968) and Murdoch to The Men from the Ministry (1962–1977). Murdoch and Costa appeared on several episodes of Frost on Sunday in 1970, where they performed new topical lyrics to the theme tune. Murdoch also did the same in 1987 for Wogan's Radio Fun.

Characters
Horne, Murdoch and Costa generally played their usual characters, under their own real names. In a history of British radio comedy Barry Took comments that Horne's "naïve, boring and foolish Senior Officer" was "the opposite of what he was in real life". He was given to asking, "Did I tell you about the time I was in Sidi Barrani?" before attempting to tell a boring anecdote, usually headed off by Murdoch. The latter's "quick-thinking, amusing and gentle CO" was "a character very like himself". His catch-phrases included "Have you read any good books lately?", when trying to change an awkward subject and, less explicably, "Good old Charlie-ee!" Costa's character was a sort of batman to the two officers; his usual opening line was, "Good morning, sir! Was there something?". Took describes the character as "the archetypal grumbling aircraftsman, brighter than his 'betters' and unhappy with his lot". Johnston takes a different view of Costa's character, calling him "the amiable chump who always got things wrong, driving his superiors mad".

The other characters appearing in the scripts were mainly handled by Maurice Denham and Diana Morrison, with assistance from some of the singers in small speaking roles. Both performers were already familiar to radio listeners, having appeared in ITMA, in which Denham's roles included the charlady, Lola Tickle; Morrison's principal ITMA character was the redoubtable Miss Hotchkiss. When Denham was unavailable during the 1954 series of Much Binding Nicholas Parsons stood in for him, but did not attempt Denham's multiplicity of roles.

Denham's principal character was the eager, obliging, upper-class Dudley Davenport, always keen to please ("Dudley Davenport at your service"). Dudley became celebrated for his characteristic gurgling laugh (spelled in the script "Keogh-keogh-keogh!"), his enthusiastic expression of approval − Oh, jolly D!" − which became well known and much used at the time, and his usual exit line, "Oh, I say, I am a fool!"; His mother, Lady Davenport, was played by the singer and actress Babs Valerie. Denham also played some 60 more characters, including Mr Blake, the sexton, who spoke rustic nonsense in an impenetrable accent; Mr Bubul, the bumbling compositor of The Weekly Bind; Ivy Plackett, the exuberant proprietress of the village shop at Little Binding; Fred, another obliging person, whose genteel mangling of vowels turned "yes" into "yays"; and Nigel, an ill-mannered silkworm, given to burping after munching his mulberry leaves. Denham's other roles included Luigi the Italian, Winston the dog, Gregory the sparrow, Group Captain Funnybone, Lieutenant-General Sir Harold Tansley-Parkinson, and the receptionist at Much-Binding, Ivy Clingbine ("Oh, what have I sayed!").

Diana Morrison's characters included the negative Miss Catcheside (catchphrase "Naah"!); the landlady, Mrs Wimpole; the effusive Miss Gibbs (Gladys), whose amorous clutches Murdoch was anxious to avoid; and Annie Potter, a cheerful cockney with an extreme and contagious glottal stop that infected the pronunciation of those around her.

Mr Greenslade, played by Nicholas Parsons, was an excitable and loquacious Bristolian, who spoke faster and faster as he became more excited. He always finished with his catchphrase, "Oh, I never let the grass grow under my feet".

Fifi de la Bon-Bon, known as Mademoiselle Fifi was the indoor games instructor; Barbara Valerie played her with, in the words of Denis Gifford, many a coquettish "Ooh la-la!". The Hon Babs du Croix Fotheringham, known as Queenie for short, played by the singer Dorothy Carless. was one of the WAAFs stationed at Much-Binding. She had little dialogue but had her own catch-phrase, "Okay, ducks!" Miss Louisa Goodbody, played by Vivienne Chatterton, was a seemingly frail old spinster who was nonetheless ready "to have a bash". 

There were four characters regularly mentioned but who never appeared: Horne's formidable wife Bessie, whose displeasure he strove to avoid ("Not a word to Bessie about this!"); Costa's wife, Emily, whose "twinges" were a regular problem; Edward Wilkinson, a mysterious and unexplained character to whom Murdoch and Horne frequently referred apropos of nothing: "By the way, have you seen anything of Edward Wilkinson lately?"; and Charlie Farnsbarns, a dogsbody often mentioned by Costa.

Music
Over its ten years, the programme featured several singers in the musical numbers in mid-show. Among them were Marilyn Williams, Maudie Edwards, Joan Winters, Dorothy Carless, Binnie Hale, Vivienne Chatterton and Gwen Catley.

In the early programmes the music was played by the RAF Orchestra, billed as "all-star", and numbering many of Britain's best young instrumentalists among its personnel. Torch conducted. The conductors of the various orchestras included Stanley Black, Billy Ternent, Harry Rabinowitz, Frank Cantell, Paul Fenoulhet, Robert Busby and Charles Shadwell. While on Radio Luxembourg, musical accompaniment for the first three programmes was provided by Woolf Phillips and the Skyrockets; the remainder of the series had music by the Squadronaires with Ronnie Aldrich as conductor. The orchestra was joined for the final series (1953–1954) by the BBC Men's Chorus, conducted by Leslie Woodgate.

Guests
In the ten years of its run Much-Binding featured occasional appearances by many guest stars, including Jean Simmons, Glynis Johns, Richard Dimbleby, Alan Ladd, Joyce Grenfell, Maudie Edwards and Phyllis Calvert.

Output

Episodes from the archives have been re-broadcast on various BBC radio channels, some as recently as 2020.

Notes, references and sources

Notes

References

Sources

External links 
Details and photos

BBC Radio comedy programmes
Fictional populated places in England
Royal Air Force mass media
1944 radio programme debuts
1954 radio programme endings
BBC Light Programme programmes
Aviation radio series